Count Imre Mikó de Hidvég (4 September 1805 – 16 September 1876) was a Hungarian statesman, politician, economist, historian and patron from Transylvania, who served as Minister of Public Works and Transport between 1867 and 1870. He was one of the liberal-oriented, prominent figures of the politics of Transylvania in the 19th century. He functioned as Governor of Transylvania twice (1848 and 1860–1861). He worked tirelessly for the rise of his home in economic, cultural and scientific areas, earning the honorary title of "Széchenyi of Transylvania".

Biography
He started his political career as an official of the Gubernium (the Government of Transylvania) in 1826, and reached the position of Treasurer in 1847, at the same time he became a leading figure of the liberal opposition in Transylvania. He was appointed interim, then actual Governor during the Hungarian Revolution of 1848. He presided the Székely National Assembly in Agyagfalva (today: Lutița, Romania), which supported the Hungarian War of Independence. 

After defeat of the uprising, he retired from the politics for a time as a follower of the Passive Resistance. He only devoted his life to the ascension of the economical and cultural life of Transylvania until the 1860s. He participated in the foundations of Transylvanian Economical Association (1854) and Transylvanian Museum Society (1859). Besides these, he had also important role in the establishment of the Franz Joseph University at Kolozsvár (today: Cluj-Napoca, Romania) in 1872. 

He sponsored the National Theatre of Kolozsvár, encouraged the emergence of modern education and agriculture and actively took part in the cases of Calvinist Diocese of Transylvania. He edited and published the three volumes of Erdélyi történelmi adatok ("Historical data handbook of Transylvania"), with this he created an essential forum of the Transylvanian historiography as an organizer of science, but he himself also wrote historical studies. 

He politicized since the 1860s again, firstly as Governor of Transylvania, later than Member of Parliament for Kolozsvár in the National Assembly of 1865. He served as Minister of Public Works and Transport in the Cabinet of Gyula Andrássy, the first government of Hungary after the Austro-Hungarian Compromise of 1867. He was associated with the construction of railway between Hungary and Transylvania, as well as the foundation of the state railway company, the predecessor of today's Hungarian State Railways (Magyar Államvasutak – MÁV).

References
 Magyar Életrajzi Lexikon

External links

References 

1805 births
1876 deaths
19th-century Hungarian historians
Hungarian literary historians
Hungarian economists
Members of the National Assembly of Hungary
Public Works and Transport ministers of Hungary
Hungarian Revolution of 1848
People from Covasna County
Székely people
Hungarian nobility